Memorial Union may refer to:

Coffman Memorial Union at the University of Minnesota-Twin Cities in Minneapolis, Minnesota
Memorial Union (Oregon State University) at Oregon State University in Corvallis, Oregon
Memorial Union (University of Missouri) at University of Missouri in Columbia, Missouri
Indiana memorial Union at Indiana University in Bloomington, Indiana
Memorial Union (Iowa State University) at Iowa State University in Ames, Iowa
Iowa Memorial Union at University of Iowa in Iowa City, Iowa
Memorial Union (University of Oklahoma) at University of Oklahoma in Norman, Oklahoma 
Memorial Union (Wisconsin) at the University of Wisconsin–Madison in Madison, Wisconsin
Purdue Memorial Union at Purdue University in West Lafayette, Indiana
Memorial Union at University of California-Davis in Davis, California
Memorial Union at the University of North Dakota in Grand Forks, North Dakota
Emporia State University Memorial Union at Emporia State University in Emporia, Kansas

See also
Memorial Union Building (disambiguation)